Knowsley is a constituency represented in the House of Commons of the UK Parliament since its 2010 creation by George Howarth of the Labour Party.

History
Created for the 2010 general election (during the Boundary Commission for England's Fifth Periodic Review of Westminster constituencies), the area returned the second highest share of the vote seen by a candidate for the Labour Party, of 70.9%, behind the 72.0% achieved in Liverpool Walton. The same ranking of results nationally occurred in 2015. It ranked foremost by party majority in 2017, where it was followed directly by East Ham and 28 other seats won by Labour candidates, after which followed North East Hampshire.

Boundaries

The new constituency covers a large part of the metropolitan borough, main settlements being Huyton and Kirkby. It replaced most of the previous Knowsley South constituency, as well as the parts of Knowsley North and Sefton East in the Knowsley borough.  Distant parts from the centre of the metropolitan borough are covered by the new St Helens South and Whiston and Garston and Halewood constituencies.

The seat has electoral wards:
Cherryfield Kirkby Central; Longview; Northwood; Page Moss; Park; Prescot West; Roby; St Bartholomews; St Gabriels; St Michaels; Shevington; Stockbridge; Swanside; Whitefield in the Metropolitan Borough of Knowsley

Constituency profile
Before its first general election in 2010, it was believed to present the safest seat in the country, with an estimated Labour majority of 24,333 votes. In 2015, it became the safest seat in the country in absolute votes (not percentage of majority), beating East Ham by 403 votes. Neighbouring Liverpool Walton has the highest percentage majority.

In 2017, it became the seat with the highest majority for any British Member of Parliament since the advent of universal suffrage, with Howarth winning a majority of 42,214 votes for Labour, surpassing the 36,230-vote majority held by then-Conservative Prime Minister John Major in his Huntingdon constituency in 1992.

The constituency mainly consists of low-income social housing and former social housing built to decant the residents displaced by post-war slum clearance in Liverpool. It includes Huyton to the south (once represented by Prime Minister Harold Wilson) and Kirkby to the north. Between them is the green space of Knowsley Hall and Park, the ancestral home of the Earls of Derby and the site of Knowsley Safari Park. In 2010, The Guardian summarised the area as "One of the most deprived areas in the country. The new parliamentary constituency folds in Knowsley North and Knowsley South."

The constituency voted to leave the European Union in 2016.

Members of Parliament

Elections

Elections in the 2010s

This was the largest numerical Labour majority at the 2019 general election.

* Served as an MP in the 2005–2010 Parliament

See also
 List of parliamentary constituencies in Merseyside

Notes

References

Politics of the Metropolitan Borough of Knowsley
Parliamentary constituencies in North West England
Constituencies of the Parliament of the United Kingdom established in 2010